Lintneria xantus is a moth of the  family Sphingidae. It is known from Baja California and north-western Mexico.

The wingspan is about 90 mm. It is similar to Lintneria istar, but is smaller, darker and less variegated and the median area of the forewing upperside has a strong pinkish tinge.

The larvae probably feed on Lamiaceae (such as Salvia, Mentha, Monarda and Hyptis), Hydrophylloideae (such as Wigandia) and Verbenaceae species (such as Verbena and Lantana).

References

xantus
Endemic Lepidoptera of Mexico
Moths of North America
Endemic fauna of the Baja California Peninsula
Moths described in 1963